The Vendicatori ('Avengers'), were a secret society of rebel-vigilantes formed about 1186 in Sicily to avenge popular wrongs. The society was finally suppressed by William II of Sicily (1155–1189), who hanged the grand master and branded the members with hot irons.

The vindicosi, or vindicators, are described as a historical sect by Francesco Maria Emanuele Gaetani (1720–1802) in his Diari palermitani (Palermo diaries). According to this author, they may date back to 1185.

See also
 Beati Paoli

References

Attribution:

Further reading
 Cities of the Underworld: Real Mafia Underground  History Channel documentary on the proto-Mafia Avengers and their catacomb networks in Palermo and Sicily

12th century in the Kingdom of Sicily
History of the Sicilian Mafia
Secret societies related to organized crime
Vigilantes